Luna\TBWA is a Slovenian advertising agency based in Ljubljana. Its clients include Si.mobil, NLB, Krka, Beiersdorf, Mars, Nissan, BMW and Henkel. In March 2012, Luna\TBWA was proclaimed the best Slovenian advertising agency of 2011 at the Slovenian Advertising Festival.

The agency was founded by Mitja Milavec in 1990 (then called Luna d.o.o.). In 2002, the agency conjoined the global advertising network TBWA (Luna TBWA d.o.o.) and started the Slovenian division of the Omnicom Group brand OMD. In 2003, it established the regional advertising network TBWA Adriatic, established in 2003, with agencies in Zagreb, Belgrade, Sarajevo and Sofia.

References

External links 
 Luna\TBWA website
 TBWA Adriatic website

Marketing companies established in 1990
Advertising agencies of Slovenia
1990 establishments in Slovenia